Barbara Caspers is an Australian Paralympic shooter. At the 1980 Arnhem Games, she won a gold medal in the Mixed Air Rifle Kneeling 1A–1C event, a silver medal in the Mixed Air Rifle 3 Positions 1A–1C event, and a bronze medal in the Mixed Air Rifle Standing 1A–1C event. At the 1984 New York/Stoke Mandeville Games, she won four gold medals in the Women's Air Rifle Kneeling 1A–1C, Women's Air Rifle Prone 1A–1C, Women's Air Rifle Standing 1A–1C, and Mixed Air Rifle 3 Positions 1A–1C events. She competed but did not win any medals at the 1988 Seoul Games.

References

Australian female sport shooters
Paralympic shooters of Australia
Shooters at the 1980 Summer Paralympics
Shooters at the 1984 Summer Paralympics
Shooters at the 1988 Summer Paralympics
Medalists at the 1980 Summer Paralympics
Medalists at the 1984 Summer Paralympics
Paralympic gold medalists for Australia
Paralympic silver medalists for Australia
Paralympic bronze medalists for Australia
Living people
Year of birth missing (living people)
Paralympic medalists in shooting
20th-century Australian women
21st-century Australian women